Podunavlje-Šumadija Zone League (Serbian: Зонска лига Подунавско-Шумадијска / Zonska liga Podunavsko-Šumadijska) is one of the Serbian Zone League divisions, the fourth tier of the Serbian football league system. It is run by the Football Association of West Serbia.

The league was founded in 2018, together with the Kolubara-Mačva Zone League, Šumadija-Raška Zone League and West Morava Zone League.

Seasons

Members for 2022–23 
The following 14 clubs competed in the Podunavlje-Šumadija Zone League during the 2022–23 season.

References

External links
 Football Association of Serbia
 Football Association of West Serbia

Serbian Zone League